René Ladreit de La Charrière (1767–1845) was a French landlord and politician. He served as a member of the Chamber of Deputies from 1815 to 1823. He became a Knight of the Legion of Honour in 1821.

References

1767 births
1845 deaths
People from Privas
Politicians from Auvergne-Rhône-Alpes
Members of the Chamber of Deputies of the Bourbon Restoration
Chevaliers of the Légion d'honneur
French landlords
19th-century landowners